Kennedy Island (local name Kasolo Island, also known as Plum Pudding Island), is a , uninhabited island in Solomon Islands that was named after John F. Kennedy, following an incident involving Kennedy during his World War II naval career. Kennedy Island lies 15 minutes by boat from Gizo, the provincial capital of the Western Province of Solomon Islands.

History

PT-109 incident

The island is notable for its role in the story of PT-109, part of the Pacific Ocean theater of World War II. In August 1943, it was to this island that the crew of the ship, commanded by then Lieutenant Kennedy, swam after their craft was rammed and sunk by the Japanese destroyer Amagiri. Two American sailors died in the incident. Kennedy later had the crew swim to the larger Olasana Island where they were found and helped by Melanesian scouts, Biuku Gasa and Eroni Kumana, dispatched by coastwatcher Reg Evans.

A small shrine to Kennedy, built by Solomon Islander Eroni Kumana who aided in the rescue of the crew, stands on the island.

Recent history

The island remains uninhabited, but is a tourist attraction. In 2003, a race was held where participants re-enacted Kennedy's swim.

Previously a public area, it was acquired in 2004 at a cost of SI$7000 (US$950) by Joseph Douglas, an advisor to then Caretaker Premier of Western Province Clement Base. The legality of the sale was the subject of a legal challenge. In 2009, Douglas sold Kennedy Island to Gizo Hotel (owned by Australian Shane Kennedy), one year after brother Dan Kennedy purchased the resort closest to Kennedy Island (Fatboys on Mbabanga Island).

See also

 Desert island
 List of islands

References

External links 
 Aerial photograph of Kennedy island

Islands of the Solomon Islands
Uninhabited islands of the Solomon Islands
Western Province (Solomon Islands)
Memorials to John F. Kennedy